Al-Fadghami is a village in southern al-Hasakah Governorate, northeastern Syria.

Administratively the village belongs to the Nahiya Markada of al-Hasakah District. At the 2004 census, it had a population of 5,062.

Qattunan
The tell of the village might be the site of the ancient Qattunan; a provincial center of the kingdom of Mari. Qattunan might be the same "Gu-da-da-num" mentioned in the Ebla tablets. It was known as "Qatni", "Qatnu" and "Qa-tu-un" to the Assyrians.

References

Populated places in al-Hasakah District